The Liverpool Institute for Performing Arts (LIPA) is a performing arts higher education institution in Liverpool, founded by Paul McCartney and Mark Featherstone-Witty and opened in 1996. LIPA offers 11 full-time BA (Hons) degrees in a range of fields across the performing arts, as well as three Foundation Certificate programmes of study in acting, music technology, and dance and popular music. LIPA offers full-time, one-year master's-level degree courses in acting (company) and costume making. It is a member of the Federation of Drama Schools.

The Education Guardian has previously ranked LIPA No. 1 in the UK for several of its degree courses, and it is regularly ranked as one of the top 10 specialist institutions. LIPA has been awarded gold by the Government's Teaching Excellence Framework (TEF), which rates higher education providers by teaching quality.

In September 2003, LIPA launched LIPA 4–19, a part-time performing arts academy for 4-to-19-year-olds. Since then, a satellite school and associate academies have also been launched. LIPA started its own primary free school in 2014 and its own sixth form free college in 2016.

History

Formation
LIPA was founded by Paul McCartney and Mark Featherstone-Witty. McCartney had known since 1985 that the building which had housed his old school, the Liverpool Institute High School for Boys, was becoming increasingly derelict after the school's closure and wished to find a productive use for it; Featherstone-Witty had set up the Brit School in London and was looking for an opportunity to open another school. McCartney and Featherstone-Witty were introduced to each other by record producer George Martin. The process of setting up the facility and the school took seven years and cost £20m.

1996–today
LIPA was opened by Queen Elizabeth II on 7 June 1996, and marked its 10th birthday in January 2006 with a performance at the Liverpool Philharmonic Hall and a new book, LIPA – The First Ten Years in Pictures, written by Featherstone-Witty.

LIPA was designated as a higher education institution (HEI) in 2006. As a performing arts HEI, LIPA is attended by the highest number of international students in the UK. LIPA has been awarded the Gold Standard from Investors in People – the only HEI to have achieved this level in the UK. LIPA also has the highest concentration of Fellows and Associates recognised by the Higher Education Academy.

In March 2012, LIPA announced that it had purchased the former building of the Liverpool College of Art for £3.7 million, to expand its teaching accommodation. Building work started on the Art School in 2014, and was completed in August 2016. Under the Free School programme, LIPA opened a primary school nearby in 2014, and a Sixth Form College in September 2016, both of which became oversubscribed.

Featherstone-Witty resigned as LIPA secretary in March 2015.

A 2017 survey of students who graduated in 2014 showed that 91% were in work, and 83% of those were working in the performing arts.

Admissions
Undergraduate tuition fees were £9,250 in 2020/21, with International tuition fees at £16,700 for 2020/21.

Current courses
LIPA qualifications are validated by Liverpool John Moores University.

Foundation Certificates
Foundation Certificate in Acting
Foundation Certificate in Dance
Foundation Certificate in Popular Music and Sound Technology

Undergraduate (Degree)
BA (Honours) Acting
BA (Honours) Acting (Screen & Digital Media)
BA (Honours) Applied theatre & Community Drama
BA (Honours) Creative Technologies & Performance (BA (Hons)/MA Arts programme)
BA (Honours) Dance
BA (Honours) Music
BA (Honours) Music (Song Writing & Performance)
BA (Honours) Music (Song Writing & Production)
BA (Honours) Arts management|Management of Music, Entertainment, Theatre & Events
BA (Honours) Sound technology
BA (Honours) Scenic design|Theatre and Performance Design
BA (Honours) Technical theatre|Theatre and Performance Technology

Master's (Degree)
Master of Arts in Acting (Company) - In association with the Everyman and Playhouse theatres.
Master of Arts in Costume Making

Companions
LIPA does not issue its own degrees, so rather than issuing Honorary degrees like other British universities, it awards "Companionships" to individuals in recognition of their contributions to the world of art and entertainment. Prospective companions often visit LIPA to give masterclasses to students, or to participate in question and answer sessions.

Companionships awarded by the institution are:

2001: Joan Armatrading +; Benny Gallagher; Malcolm McLaren
2002: Stephen Bayley; Anthony Field; Thelma Holt; Tony Wilson
2003: Barbara Dickson; Anthony Everitt; Nickolas Grace; Andy McCluskey
2004: The Bangles; Ken Campbell (actor); Tim Firth; Terry Marshall; Arlene Phillips; Willy Russell; Jon Webster
2005: Guy Chambers; Robin Gibb; Alec McCowen; Tim Wheeler
2006: Lynda Bellingham; Sir Ken Robinson; Jörg Sennheiser; Terence Stamp; David Stark
2007: Anita Dobson; Alan McGee; David Pugh; Ralph Koltai; Steve Levine; Ben Elton
2008: John Hurt; Trevor Horn; Cathy Dennis; Ann Harrison; Nitin Sawhney; Lea Anderson
2009: Will Young; Joe McGann; Pippa Ailion; John Fox; Richard Hudson; Natricia Bernard; Tony Platt
2010: Alan Moulder; LaVelle Smith Jnr; Dave Pammenter; Christopher Oram; Jonathan Pryce; Heather Knight; Midge Ure; Mark Summers was also presented as an Honoured Friend.
2011: Colin Eccleston; David Bell; Paule Constable; Caroline Elleray; Chris Johnson; Steve Nestar; Billy Ocean; Hannah Waddingham; Spencer Leigh was also presented as an Honoured Friend.
2012: Matthew Bourne; Pam Schweitzer; Kevin Godley; Gary lloyd; Michael Harrison; Jason Barnes; Owen Lewis; Victor Greenberg was also presented as an Honoured Friend
2013: Keith Johnstone; Mark Ronson; Stephen Mear; Xenon Schoepe; Andy Hayles; Seymour Stein; Rowena Morgan was also presented as an Honoured Friend
2014: Don Black; Samuel West; Adrian Jackson; Nick Starr; Colin Richmond; Patrick Woodroffe; Briony Albert; Giles Martin. Janice Long and Suzahn Fiering were presented as Honoured Friends.
2015: Gemma Bodinetz; Fran Healy; Noddy Holder; Conor Murphy; Hugh Padgham; Scott Rodger; James Thompson; Sharon Watson. John T Rago was also presented as an Honoured Friend
2016: Martin Levan; Tim Prentki; David Babani; Darren Henley; Christopher Manoe; Alan Lane; Christopher Shutt; Tom Robinson. Tetsuo Hamada; Paul Whiting were also presented as honoured friends
2017: Woody Harrelson; Chris Difford; John Caird; Jon Burton; Kay Hilton; Jo Collins; Mary Ward; Jon Driscoll. Tony Wood was also presented as an honoured friend.
2018: Toyah Willcox; Nile Rodgers; John Leonard; Paul Burger; Ali Campbell; Felice Ross; Dean Lee.
2019: Stephen Fry; Rowan Atkinson; Mike Batt; Lucy Carter; Sue Gill; Steve Lewis; Tom Pye; Kenrick Sandy; Andrew Scheps. Cliff Cooper was made an Honoured Friend of LIPA.

+ denotes a Companion who is also a LIPA Patron.

Notable alumni

 Leanne Best, film and television actress
 Alyssa Bonagura (2009) American singer/songwriter
 Gabrielle Brooks, actress
 Jan Burton, music producer
 Peter Caulfield, actor
 Circa Waves, indie rock band (Joe Falconer, Sam Rourke)
 Clean Cut Kid, indie pop band
 Dan Croll, singer-songwriter
 Mike Crossey, music producer and mix engineer
 Douglas Dare, singer-songwriter
 The Daydream Club, music duo
 Mark Franks, singer in The Overtones
 Fickle Friends, indie pop band (Natassja Shiner, Sam Morris)
 Mads Hauge, songwriter and producer
 Kate Havnevik, Norwegian singer-songwriter
 Her's, indie rock duo
 Dag Holtan-Hartwig, Norwegian singer-songwriter
 Holly Humberstone, singer-songwriter
 David Hutchinson, founder and Artistic Director of Selladoor Worldwide 
 Christian Ingebrigtsen, Norwegian singer-songwriter and musician (A1)
 Seun Kuti, Afrobeat musician
 Jamie Lloyd, director 
 Jon Lolis, actor (Hollyoaks)
 Liam Lynch, US-based singer, writer & director
 Eugene McGuinness, singer/songwriter signed to Domino records.
 Dawn O'Porter, writer, director and TV presenter
 Mikhael Paskalev, Norwegian singer-songwriter
 Hannah Peel, artist, producer, composer
 Pixey band members
 Connor Ratliff, American comedian and actor
 Jessica Reynolds, actress
 The Staves, folk trio (Jessica Staveley-Taylor)
 Iselin Solheim, Norwegian singer and songwriter
 Stealing Sheep, folk band (Rebecca Hawley)
 Lisa Stokke, Norwegian singer and actress
 Sandi Thom, Scottish singer-songwriter
 Liz White, actress (Life on Mars)
 The Wombats, indie rock trio

See also
Liverpool Knowledge Quarter
Liverpool Institute High School for Boys

References

External links
LIPA 'History & Heritage page'
LIPA website
LIPA 4:19 Primary School
LIPA Sixth Form College
LIPA Alumni page

 
Cultural organisations based in Liverpool
Education in Liverpool
Drama schools in the United Kingdom
Music schools in England
Higher education colleges in England
Educational institutions established in 1996
1996 establishments in England
Schools of the performing arts in the United Kingdom